Izmaylova's House (also Izmaylovs' House or Timofeevs' House) is a historically significant building in Pushkin, Saint Petersburg, built between 1836 and 1839 The building is located on 27 Oranzherejnaya Street, facing Cathedral Square (aka Sobornaya Square).

History 
According to the general plan of the city, the eastern side of Cathedral Square was intended to host government agencies, but remained empty for a long time. In 1835, some plots were reallocated for the construction of private residential buildings. The complex of five houses were designed by an architect name Sebastian Cherfolio. Plot No. 288a was selected for the home of Izmailova, a titular counsellor. 

Later, collegiate assessor P. P. Izmailov became owner of the house. Years later, the Timofeevs lived in the building. In 1914, the building was home to Leonov's store of colonial produce. In the 21st century, the city's prosecutor's office occupied the second floor.

Architecture 
The house features elements of late Neoclassical architecture. It is similar to Emelianov's house in terms of symmetry. The center of composition of both houses is a double arch, harmonizing with the arches of St. Catherine's Cathedral. Later, the same arches were reproduced on the Gostiny Dvor's facade. The facades are crowned with wide gables. They are decorated with a relief, only partially preserved, depicting a wreath and a lyre. The original metal brackets for lamps have not been preserved.

References

Literature

Sources 
 
 

Buildings and structures in Pushkin
Houses completed in 1839
1839 establishments in the Russian Empire
Cultural heritage monuments of regional significance in Saint Petersburg